Vietnamese hand embroidery is a traditional craft dating back 700 years. Usually, tiny threads are used to create brightly coloured pictures on cloth. It is a popular extracurricular activity for young girls in high school. Traditionally, girls are expected to know how to decorate pillowcases, curtains and tablecloths with hand embroidery.

See also
Culture of Vietnam

References

Embroidery by country
Textile arts of Vietnam